John Barnard (born 1946) is an English race car designer.

John Barnard may also refer to:
John Barnard (music publisher) (fl. 1625–1649), first to publish a collection of English cathedral music
John Barnard (clergyman) (1681–1770), Congregationalist minister from Massachusetts
John Barnard (shipbuilder) (1705–1784), English shipbuilder to the Royal Navy
John Barnard (composer) (born 1948), English church music composer
John G. Barnard (1815–1882), U.S. Army officer
John Barnard (cricketer) (1794–1878), English cricketer
John Barnard (cyclist) (1885–1977), British Olympic cyclist
John Barnard (politician) (1685–1764), British Whig MP
John Barnard (biographer) (died 1683), English biographer of Peter Heylyn
John Barnard (supporter of James II) (1662–?)

See also
John Bernard (disambiguation)